The term isometric comes from the Greek for "having equal measurement".

isometric may mean:

 Cubic crystal system, also called isometric crystal system
 Isometre, a rhythmic technique in music.
 "Isometric (Intro)", a song by Madeon from the album, Adventure
 Isometric exercise, a form of resistance exercise in which one's muscles are used in opposition with other muscle groups, to increase strength, for bodybuilding, physical fitness, or strength training.
 Isometric video game graphics, a near-isometric parallel projection used in computer art.
 Isometric joystick, a type of pointing stick, a computer input option
 Isometric platform game, a video game subgenre.
 Isometric process, a thermodynamic process at constant volume (also isovolumetric)
 Isometric projection (or "isometric perspective"), a method for the visual representation of three-dimensional objects in two dimensions; a form of orthographic projection, or more specifically, an axonometric projection.
 Isometric scaling, the opposite of allometry, which occurs when changes in size (during growth or over evolutionary time) do not lead to changes in proportion.
 Isometry and isometric embeddings in mathematics, a distance-preserving representation of one metric space as a subset of another. Like congruence in geometry.

See also
 Isometry (disambiguation)
 Isometric video game (disambiguation)